A list of films produced in Argentina in 1959:

External links and references
 Argentine films of 1959 at the Internet Movie Database

1959
Argentine
Films